Trevor Fenner (born 30 November 1933) is a South African former cricketer. He played in one first-class match for Border in 1962/63.

See also
 List of Border representative cricketers

References

External links
 

1933 births
Living people
South African cricketers
Border cricketers
Sportspeople from Qonce